Salguero is a surname. Notable people with the surname include:

Carlos Salguero (1955–2006), Argentine footballer
Elizabeth Salguero (born 1964), Bolivian politician
Felipe Salguero, Mexican professional boxer
Gabriel Salguero, Argentinian footballer
Gerónimo Salguero (1774—1847), Argentine statesman and lawyer
Gloria Salguero Gross (1941–2015), Salvadoran politician and businesswoman
Gustavo Adolfo Espina Salguero (born 1946), Guatemalan politician
José Antonio Salguero (born 1960), Spanish footballer
Laura Salguero (born 1978), Spanish footballer
Olinda Salguero (born 1984), Guatemalan activist
Rafael Salguero (born 1946), Guatemalan football administrator
Salvador Salguero (swimmer) (born 1967), Salvadoran swimmer